Andaruni in Iranian architecture, is the inner quarter where the women lived. It has been described as harem in Arabic.

Private space 
In traditional Persian residential architecture the andaruni is a part of the house in which the private quarters are established. This is specifically where the women of the house are free to move about without being seen by an outsider (na mahram). This is also the place where women can interact with their kin (maharim) without following the dress code or without wearing the hijab.

In case the patriarch of the house had more than one wife, each wife is given her own section in the andaruni as is the case for her mother-in-law or sister-in-law if they live with the family. The only men allowed in this area are those directly related to the lord of the house (his sons) and the lord himself, which may include boys under the age of puberty, and guests allowed in under special circumstances.

The court (usually in the talar) of the house would usually be situated in the andaruni.

Dichotomy 
Andaruni's equivalent space for men is called biruni. These two sections, which are both built around a garden, are part of the so-called interior-exterior dichotomy of Persian houses, which denotes the spatial divide between andaruni and biruni segment. The former is the private space while the latter represents the public quarter as it is also the place where business and ceremonies are conducted. Messengers, who are usually young boys, are employed in the interaction between the two quarters.

See also
Women-only space
Zenana

References

Farhang-i Vazhe- Haaye- Memari-i Sonnati-i Iran (Dictionary of terms in Traditional Iranian Architecture). Fallahfar, S. 2000. Tehran.

Further reading
 Djamalzadeh, M. A.  Andarun. Encyclopedia Iranica.
 Nabizadeh, Sima; Uraz, Türkan Ulusu. The Modern Woman Vis-À-Vis The Modern House: The Hallmarks Of Modern Nationhood Through The 1920s-1940s Iran. June 2017. METU Journal of the Faculty of Architecture 34(1). DOI:10.4305/METU.JFA.2017.1.8

Architecture in Iran
Houses in Iran
Persian words and phrases
Iranian inventions